Echo Seeker is an autonomous underwater vehicle (AUV) built by Boeing.

The vehicle is a larger version of Boeing's earlier Echo Ranger AUV, and was designed and built by the company's Advanced Technology Programs division in Huntington Beach, California, which publicly unveiled Echo Seeker in July 2015. Once deployed, Echo Seeker operates largely autonomously, with communication to the surface limited to a weak acoustic system.

References

Robotic submarines
2015 ships